Pasila Rail Tunnel is a former 650-meter railway tunnel under Itä-Pasila residential area in Helsinki, Finland. It used to serve as part of the Sörnäinen harbour rail from 1965 to 2008. The west end of the tunnel located near Pasila railway station and ended up in Vallila in the east.

The decision to build the tunnel came from the need for a more durable and less interrupted way from Pasila to Sörnäinen Harbour (today's Kalasatama). The railway built in 1863 ran directly along today's Teollisuuskatu. As the street was built, narrower at that time, the rail traffic soon became troublesome in the area. The new route was established through Vallilanlaakso and Kyläsaari, with the  tunnel included.

Reuse 
The harbour railway was dismantled in 2009–2010, though the tunnel remained walkable for almost a decade after. An initiative was made for the tunnel to be renovated into a cycling tunnel, similar to Baana in the city centre, but the idea was soon shot down by the city planners. The tunnel remained abandoned until 2020 when the eastern entrance was shut and notable renovation started to turn part of the tunnel into  indoor running track. The track, as part of the new Urhea campus, was opened in summer 2021.

References

External links
 

Railway tunnels in Finland
Transport in Helsinki
Buildings and structures in Helsinki
Tunnels completed in 2008